Malarani is a Rural municipality located within the Arghakhanchi District of the Lumbini Province of Nepal.
The rural municipality spans  of area, with a total population of 28,044 according to a 2011 Nepal census.

On March 10, 2017, the Government of Nepal restructured the local level bodies into 753 new local level structures.
The previous Khan, Khandaha, Bangi, Hansapur, Gorkhunga, Arghatos (half portion), and Mareng VDCs were merged to form Malarani Rural Municipality.
Malarani is divided into 9 wards, with Khandaha declared the administrative center of the rural municipality.

References

External links
official website of the rural municipality

Rural municipalities in Arghakhanchi District
Rural municipalities of Nepal established in 2017